Ron Travis (born 1954) is an American politician. He serves as a Republican member of the Tennessee House of Representatives for the 31st district, encompassing parts of  Bledsoe, Roane, Sequatchie and Rhea Counties. He was last elected November 6, 2018 and he has been in office for 7 years. His term ends in 2020.

Biography

Early life
He was born on November 3, 1954. He attended Tennessee State University, but did not graduate.

Career
He formerly owned an insurance agency with Nationwide Mutual Insurance Company with five branches in East Tennessee. He was an Insurance agent for 27 years.

Since 2012, he has served as State Representative for the 31st district of Tennessee, replacing Jim Cobb. He is a member of the House Agriculture and Natural Resources Committee, the House Insurance and Banking Committee, and the House Agriculture and Natural Resources Subcommittee. His community involvement is also unreal! He is the house member of the 108th through 111th General Assemblies, member of Downtown Dayton Association, Pikeville, Dayton, Dunlap, and Roane County Chamber of Commerce, Emmaus Community, Executive Board Southeast Tennessee Rural Planning Organization, and the Board of Directors National Association of Christian Athletes.

He opposes school vouchers.

Personal life
He is married to his wife Laura. Together, they have two daughters, Rachel Travis and Jessica Shannon. Laura and Ron have four grandchildren. Alley Jo Shannon, Becham Colby Shannon, Finley Scout Shannon and Hadley Jane Travis.

His home city is Dayton Tennessee. He is a Methodist and attends First United Methodist Church in Dayton.

Committees 

 Chair, Business Subcommittee
 Chair, Joint Fiscal Review Committee
 Member, Commerce Committee
 Member, Consumer and Human Resources Committee
 Member, Consumer Subcommittee
 Member, Local Committee
 Member, Cities and Counties Subcommittee

Community Involvement 

 House Member of the 108th though 111th General Assemblies
 Member of Downtown Dayton Association
 Pikeville, Dayton, Dunlap, and Roane County Chamber of Commerce
 Civitan
 Emmaus Community
 Executive Board Southeast Tennessee Rural Planning Organization
 Board of Directors National Association of Christian Athletes

Rewards and Honors 
As of 2017, he had earned the following:

 Tennessee Development District Association Legislator of the Year 2017
 Nationwide Insurance President's and Champion's conference qualifier multiple years
 Life Underwriter's Training Council Fellow (LUTCF)
 Tennessee Men's Health - Outstanding Legislative Leadership Award 2014
 Tennessee Development District Association - Legislator of the Year Award 2014
 Tennessee Chamber of Commerce Champion of Commerce Award 2014

2018 Election

General election for Tennessee House of Representatives District 31



2016 Election



2014 Election

2012 Election

Contact Information 
rep.ron.travis@capitol.tn.gov

(615) 741-1450

Office Address:

636 CHB

Nashville, TN 37243

References 

Living people
1954 births
Republican Party members of the Tennessee House of Representatives
21st-century American politicians